Maurice Sauvé,  (September 20, 1923 – April 13, 1992) was a Canadian economist, politician, cabinet minister, businessman, and husband of Jeanne Sauvé, 23rd Governor General of Canada.

Born in Montreal, Quebec, he was elected to the House of Commons of Canada in the 1962 federal elections as a Liberal representing the riding of Îles-de-la-Madeleine. He was re-elected in 1963 and 1965. He was defeated in 1968. From 1964 to 1968, he was the Minister of Forestry (after 1966 renamed Minister of Forestry and Rural Development).

He was the first President of the World Assembly of Youth (WAY), and served for a period from 1949 to 1952.

From 1985 to 1991, he was Chancellor of the University of Ottawa.

In 1984, he was made a Companion of the Order of Canada as the viceregal consort of Canada.

Arms

Archives 
There is a Maurice Sauvé fonds at Library and Archives Canada.

References

External links
 
 
 

1923 births
1992 deaths
Businesspeople from Montreal
Canadian viceregal consorts
Chancellors of the University of Ottawa
Companions of the Order of Canada
Liberal Party of Canada MPs
Members of the House of Commons of Canada from Quebec
Members of the King's Privy Council for Canada
Politicians from Montreal
Burials at Notre Dame des Neiges Cemetery
20th-century Canadian businesspeople